Peeter Kreitzberg (14 December 1948 – 3 November 2011) was an Estonian politician, member of parliament and a member of the Social Democratic Party. Kreitzberg served as the Estonian Minister of Culture and Education from April to November 1995. He also taught at Tallinn University from 1997 to 2011.

Kreitzberg next served as the deputy mayor of Tallinn, the Estonian capital, from 1996 to 1999. He was elected to the Riigikogu, the nation's unicameral parliament, in 1999. He remained a member of parliament until his death in 2011. Kreitzberg served as the deputy chairman of the Riigikogu for two different tenures, from 2001 to 2003 and again from 2003 to 2005. He was also a candidate for President of Estonia in 2001.

Peeter Kreitzberg departed Estonia in October 2011 for an official visit to China, which was scheduled to last from 28 October to 4 November. He was accompanied by three other parliamentarians in the delegation — Kalev Kallo, Maret Maripuu and Sven Sester. Kreitzberg died in his Chinese hotel during the official visit on 3 November 2011, at the age of 62.

References

1948 births
2011 deaths
Government ministers of Estonia
Members of the Riigikogu, 1999–2003
Members of the Riigikogu, 2003–2007
Members of the Riigikogu, 2007–2011
Members of the Riigikogu, 2011–2015
Social Democratic Party (Estonia) politicians
Recipients of the Order of the National Coat of Arms, 3rd Class
University of Tartu alumni
People from Pärnu
21st-century Estonian politicians